Chafing can refer to:

 Chafing (nautical), damage to sails or other parts of a boat from rubbing
 Chafing (skin), skin irritation from rubbing or sweat

See also
 Chafing dish
 Chafing fuel